Colonel Edmund Gilling Watts Hallewell (April 1822 – 1869) was a British Army officer who became Commandant of the Royal Military College, Sandhurst.

Early life
Hallewell was born the son of Edmund Gilling Hallewell. He married Sophia, the daughter of General Sir William Reid.

Military career
Educated at Rugby School, Hallewell was commissioned as an ensign in the 28th Regiment of Foot on 31 December 1839. He was promoted to lieutenant in April 1842 and to captain in December 1848. He became Deputy Assistant Quartermaster-General to the Light Division and fought at the Battle of Alma in September 1854, the Battle of Inkermann in November 1854 and at the siege of Sebastopol in Winter 1854 during the Crimean War. He was awarded the French Legion of Honour (Chevalier), the Ottoman Order of the Medjidie, 5th Class and the Sardinian Silver Medal of Military Valor. He was promoted to brevet major in December 1854, to lieutenant-Colonel in November 1855 and to colonel in November 1860. He went on to be Commandant of the Royal Military College, Sandhurst in March 1864.

References

1822 births
1869 deaths
28th Regiment of Foot officers
Commandants of Sandhurst
Recipients of the Order of the Medjidie, 5th class
Chevaliers of the Légion d'honneur
British Army personnel of the Crimean War